The Crédit agricole du Maroc is a bank based in Rabat, Morocco.

References

Banks of Morocco
Rabat